Falling Through a Field is the first studio album by the American psychedelic rock band Black Moth Super Rainbow, released in 2003. It is the band's fourth album if releases under the name Satanstompingcaterpillars are included in the chronology. Some of the songs here were from the Satanstompingcaterpillars era albums, such as "The Autumn Kaleidoscope Got Changed" and "The Most Wonderfulest Thing".

Track listing
 "Vietcaterpillar" - 2:07
 "I Think It Is Beautiful That You Are 256 Colors Too" - 2:21
 "Season for Blooming" - 2:15
 "Letter People Show" - 3:49
 "Dandelion Graves" - 4:46
 "Boxphones" - 2:44
 "Smog in Cities" - 2:39
 "Your Doppelganger" - 1:49
 "Falling Through a Field" - 2:18
 "Colorful Nickels" - 3:53
 "One Flowery Sabbath" - 1:59
 "Sun Organ" - 0:59
 "Boatfriend" - 2:44
 "The Magical Butterfly Net" - 2:36
 "Last House in the Enchanted Forest" - 1:49
 "Lake Feet" - 2:23
 "Melody For Color Spectrum" - 8:02

 In original pressings, "Melody For Color Spectrum" was hidden from the track listing.

Expanded Edition
In 2007, Graveface Records re-released Falling Through a Field with added bonus tracks, under the title Falling Through a Field: Expanded Edition. These are tracks 18-23 in the reissue:

 "Monohymn"
 "The Sad Branch"
 "Silo"
 "Jogging Home"
 "Aloysius Version Opposite B"
 "Yourteethandface(marchingalong)"

References

2003 debut albums
Black Moth Super Rainbow albums